The following article shows a list of caves in Austria. The list also includes ice caves and tourist former salt caves (Salzwelten).

Overview
The main concentration of Austrian caves (German: Höhle) is in the Northern Limestone Alps, a mountain range of the Eastern Alps. Many of them are located in the geographical region of Salzkammergut and in the Totes Gebirge.

Caves
The caves are listed by alphabetical order and there are shown the main tourist caves and other notable (ex.: archaeological or paleontological) underground voids. In the "length" section is shown, between parentheses, the cave's trail as a show cave (SC).

See also
List of caves
Simplified list for Austria
 Speleology
Underground mines in Austria

Notes

References

External links

Schauhoehlen.at - Official Austrian showcaves portal
Salzwelten.at - Official tourist Austrian salt caves portal
Show caves of Austria on showcaves.com

 
Austria
Caves